The Pre-Fix for Death is the third studio album by American horrorcore musician Necro, released on September 21, 2004 by Psycho+Logical-Records. Unlike his previous albums, The Pre-Fix for Death sees Necro fusing death metal into several of the album's tracks. It is also the first album to feature live instrumentation by Necro himself.

The album contains 17 studio tracks, one remix, five skits, an intro and an outro. Featured guest vocalists on the album include Jenny Krenwinkle, Jamey Jasta of Hatebreed, Charles Manson (albeit a sample), John Tardy of Obituary, Necro's brother Ill Bill, Goretex, Mr. Hyde, Sabac, Danny Diablo of Crown of Thornz, and Jenny Cassabian. Featured guest instrumentalists on the album include Away of Voivod, Sean Martin of Hatebreed, Trevor Peres of Obituary, Dan Lilker of Nuclear Assault, and Sid Wilson of Slipknot.

Track listing
All songs are produced by Necro
 "Intro" – 0:43
 "Beautiful Music for You to Die to" – 3:22
 "The Dispensation of Life and Death" – 3:22
 "Kill That Shit" – 3:09
 "Pre-Fix" (skit) (featuring Jenny Krenwinkle) – 0:51
 "The Pre-Fix for Death" (featuring Away) – 3:49
 "Push It to the Limit" (featuring Jamey Jasta) – 3:32
 "Reflection of Children Coming Up in the Grave" (featuring Charles Manson) – 4:24
 "It" (skit) – 1:08
 "Insaneology" (featuring Sean Martin, John Tardy and Dan Lilker) – 4:49
 "Nirvana" (performed by Circle of Tyrants) – 3:32
 "86 Measures of Game" – 5:17
 "Empowered" (featuring Sid Wilson, Trevor Peres, John Tardy, Away and Dan Lilker) – 3:37
 "Kid Joe" (skit) – 1:21
 "Human Consumption" – 3:52
 "Evil Shit" – 3:30
 "You Did it" – 3:17
 "Rogue" (skit) – 0:24
 "Death Rap" (featuring Sabac Red) – 3:14
 "Watch Your Back" (featuring Danny Diablo) – 3:03
 "Food for Thought" – 3:43
 "Important Statistics" (skit) – 0:38
 "Senseless Violence" (featuring Jenny Cassabian) – 3:11
 "Push it to the Limit" (NYHC Mix) (featuring Jamey Jasta) – 3:32
 "Outro" – 0:10

The Pre-Fix for Death Instrumentals

The Pre-Fix for Death Instrumentals is the instrumental version of American hip hop musician Necro's third studio album, released on June 20, 2005 by Psycho+Logical-Records. It features instrumental versions of all 18 actual songs from The Pre-Fix for Death, excluding the seven skits.

Track listing
 "Beautiful Music for You to Die to" – 3:24
 "The Dispensation of Life and Death" – 3:24
 "Kill That Shit" – 3:12
 "The Pre-Fix for Death" – 3:51
 "Push it to the Limit" – 3:31
 "Reflection of Children Coming Up in the Grave" – 4:25
 "Insaneology" – 4:49
 "Nirvana" – 3:36
 "86 Measures of Game" – 4:53
 "Empowered" – 3:31
 "Human Consumption" – 3:25
 "Evil Shit" – 3:33
 "You Did it" – 3:08
 "Death Rap" – 3:16
 "Watch Your Back" – 3:08
 "Food for Thought" – 3:42
 "Senseless Violence" – 3:16
 "Push it to the Limit" (NYHC Mix) – 3:29

Trivia
 "Death Rap", in addition to being the title of the nineteenth track on the album, is also the title of Necro's fifth studio album.
 The beat used in "Evil Shit" was taken from the 1976 horror film Blood Sucking Freaks, which Necro has admitted being a fan of on numerous occasions. The chorus of the song was taken from a line in a Necro song, "Bury You with Satan", released three years prior on his second studio album Gory Days.
 "The Dispensation of Life and Death" uses samples from the song "Apoteosi del mistero" performed and arranged by swedish progressive rock band Morte Macabre, featured in Lucio Fulci's City of the Living Dead, originally composed by Fabio Frizzi.
 The track "You Did It" samples the audio from Budd Dwyer's 1987 suicide.
 The track "Push it to the Limit" uses lyrics from "Scarface (Push It to the Limit)", a song from the 1983 gangster film Scarface, in its chorus. The beat was also sampled from the 1981 kung-fu flick called "The Guy with the Secret Kung Fu."

Personnel
 Necro – vocals, guitar, bass, organ, arranging, composing, writing, production, mixing
 Elliot Thomas – engineering, mixing
 Charles De Monterello – mastering
 Elliot Thomas – mixing
 Jenny Krenwinkle – guest vocals
 Away – guest drums, songwriting
 Jamey Jasta – guest vocals
 Charles Manson – guest vocals
 Dan Lilker – guest bass, songwriting
 Sean Martin – guest guitar, songwriting
 John Tardy – guest vocals, songwriting
 Goretex – guest vocals, songwriting
 Ill Bill – guest vocals, songwriting
 Mr. Hyde – guest vocals, songwriting
 Trevor Peres – guest guitar, songwriting
 Sid Wilson – guest scratches, songwriting
 The Kid Joe – guest vocals
 Sabac – guest vocals, songwriting
 Danny Diablo – guest vocals, songwriting
 Jenny Cassabian – guest vocals
 Edward J. Repka – cover art

References

2004 albums
Necro (rapper) albums
Albums with cover art by Ed Repka
Psycho+Logical-Records albums